Apihimal is a Rural council (Gaupalika) in Darchula District in the Sudurpashchim Province of far-western Nepal. 
Apihimal has a population of 6779.The land area is 613.95 km2.

Etymology
The rural council has named after the Api (mountain), here the word Himal stands for the Nepali translation of Mountain.

Geography
There are mountains such as Api, Nampa, Kapchuli and Jethi in this rural municipality.

References

Rural municipalities in Darchula District
Rural municipalities of Nepal established in 2017